ADP/ATP translocase 1, or adenine nucleotide translocator 1 (ANT1), is an enzyme that in humans is encoded by the SLC25A4 gene.

Interactions 

SLC25A4 has been shown to interact with Bcl-2-associated X protein.

References

Further reading 

 
 
 
 
 
 
 
 
 
 
 
 
 
 
 
 
 
 
 
 Wang, X., Middleton, F. A., Tawil, R., & Chen, X. J. (2020). "Cytosolic Adaptation to Mitochondrial Precursor Overaccumulation Stress Induces Progressive Muscle Wasting". bioRxiv, 733097. https://doi.org/10.1101/733097

External links 
 

Solute carrier family